Redęcin  (German: 1297–1672 Reddenthin, 1672–1945 Reddentin) is a village in the administrative district of Gmina Słupsk, within Słupsk County, Pomeranian Voivodeship, in northern Poland. It is located in the historic region of Pomerania.

The village has a population of 217.

History
The area became part of the emerging Polish state in the 10th century. In 1307, the area was invaded and annexed from Poland by the Margraviate of Brandenburg, then it passed to the Duchy of Pomerania in 1317, and from 1368 it formed part of the Duchy of Słupsk, a vassal duchy of the Kingdom of Poland. From the 18th century it was part of the Kingdom of Prussia, and from 1871 it was also part of Germany. Following Germany's defeat in World War II in 1945, the area became again part of Poland.

People 
 Nikolaus von Below (1648-1707), Prussian general

References

Villages in Słupsk County